Belhi  is a village development committee in Sarlahi District in the Janakpur Zone of south-eastern Nepal. At the time of the 1991 Nepal census it had a population of 2,484 people living in 437 individual households. It is separated by Malangwa the capital of sarlahi by Jhim river and close to the India border.

References

External links
UN map of the municipalities of Sarlahi  District

Populated places in Sarlahi District

[ [ anil thakur] ] young leader